Armento is a town and comune in the province of Potenza, in the Southern Italian region of Basilicata. The Armento Rider was found in the vicinity of Armento and is now in the British Museum. The Kritonios Crown, a 4th-century BC gold wreath representing a crown of convolvulus, narcissus, ivy, roses, and myrtle was found there in the 19th century and is now in the Staatliche Antikensammlungen.

References

Cities and towns in Basilicata